Hindustan Institute of Technology and Science (HITS), formerly Hindustan College of Engineering, is a deemed-to-be-university  headquartered in Chennai, India. It was founded in 1985 by K.C.G. Verghese and was conferred the "University Status"  status from the University Grants Commission Under Section 3 of UGC Act 1956 from the academic year 2008-09 and under the name HITS (Hindustan Institute of Technology and Science). It is a member of the Hindustan Group of Institutions which also includes the Hindustan Institute of Engineering Technology, KCG College of Technology, Hindustan College of Arts and Science and more.

Accreditation
HITS has been accredited by the National Assessment and Accreditation Council (NAAC) with 'A' Grade.

Rankings

The National Institutional Ranking Framework (NIRF) ranked it 172 among engineering colleges in 2021.

Notable alumni

Arav, actor, model

References

External links

 

Deemed universities in Tamil Nadu
Academic institutions formerly affiliated with the University of Madras
1985 establishments in Tamil Nadu
Educational institutions established in 1985